Henry Gilbert (4 April 1913 - 29 January 1973) was an English-born Australian actor who appeared in many popular 1960s and 1970s British TV programmes.

Selected credits
 Long John Silver, 1954 - Billy Bowlegs
 The Return of Mr. Moto, 1965 - David Lennox
 Danger Man, 1966, "I Can Only Offer You Sherry" - Seghir
 Adam Adamant Lives!, 1967, "The Deadly Bullet" - George Manton
 The Champions, 1968, "Twelve Hours" - Drobnic
 Sir Arthur Conan Doyle's Sherlock Holmes, 1968, "The Dancing Men" - Dr Armstrong
 Song of Norway, 1970 - Franz Liszt
 Jason King, 1971, "A Page Before Dying" - Schultz
 Doctor Who, 1972, The Curse of Peladon - Torbis
 Ooh... You Are Awful, 1972 - Don Luigi

References

External links
 

English male television actors
1913 births
1973 deaths
20th-century English male actors
British expatriates in Australia